Marcos Prono (born 16 May 1975) is a Paraguayan former swimmer. He competed in the men's 100 metre backstroke and men's 200 metre backstroke events at the 1992 Summer Olympics held in Barcelona, Spain.

References

External links
 

1975 births
Living people
Paraguayan male swimmers
Male backstroke swimmers
Olympic swimmers of Paraguay
Swimmers at the 1992 Summer Olympics
Swimmers at the 1991 Pan American Games
Pan American Games competitors for Paraguay
Place of birth missing (living people)